Area 51: Site 4 is a light gun arcade game developed by Atari Games and released in 1998. It is a sequel to the original Area 51, picking up where that game left off. Though the graphics have been improved, they rely on the same FMV streaming technology as the original, and the gameplay remains largely the same as the original game.

Gameplay
The game is broken down into two menus: field exercise and adventure. Field Exercise is the main mode of the game. The training levels are based on brief missions where the player must complete all "training challenges" and the "real mission" (in either order). Completing all the training challenges will involve shooting zombies that are contained in the labs, shooting barrels being thrown right at you, protecting a bus from aliens trying to roll it over, and destroying alien ships, turrets, and missiles. In the final mission, the player must go into a vast warehouse to destroy a giant red alien with multiple limbs, shooting zombies and aliens. The player will lose a life if hit by an enemy, shooting a S.T.A.A.R. team member, failing to complete a quota or letting the bus tip over where the player must protect it.

After the game is beaten, a short sequence of clips are played involving S.T.A.A.R. members, ending with the message, "S.T.A.A.R. Wants You!" similar to the real-world Uncle Sam army recruitment posters.  The intro is only seen in attract mode as an intro loop. The end credits can only be seen after playing without putting initials.

Reception
The Atari Times gave the game a positive review, stating "I cannot tell you enough that this game is very good. I mean it has great graphics, It has OK sound, amazing control and incredible gameplay. I mean, what more could you ask for in an arcade shooter?"

References

External links

1998 video games
Alien invasions in video games
Arcade video games
Arcade-only video games
Atari arcade games
Light gun games
Video games about extraterrestrial life
Video games developed in the United States